Crabtree is an unincorporated community in Fresno County, California.

The name honors John F. Crabtree, who homesteaded here in 1911.

References

External links
 The location of Crabtree, California at RoadsideThoughts

Unincorporated communities in California
Unincorporated communities in Fresno County, California